Sandra Azón Canalda (born 12 November 1973 in Barcelona) is a Spanish sailor, who won a silver medal in the 470 class at the 2004 Summer Olympics in Athens together with Natalia Vía Dufresne.

Azon finished sixth at the 2000 Summer Olympics, and won a bronze medal at the 2001 World Championships. She became world champion in the Yngling class in 2002.

Notes

References

External links
 
 
 
 

1973 births
Living people
Spanish female sailors (sport)
Sailors from Catalonia
Sailors at the 2000 Summer Olympics – 470
Sailors at the 2004 Summer Olympics – 470
Sailors at the 2008 Summer Olympics – Yngling
Olympic sailors of Spain
Olympic silver medalists for Spain
Sportspeople from Barcelona
Olympic medalists in sailing
Medalists at the 2004 Summer Olympics
21st-century Spanish women